Resurrection (Spanish: Resurrección) is a 1943 Mexican period drama film directed by Gilberto Martínez Solares based on the 1899 novel Resurrection by Leo Tolstoy. It relocates Tolstoy's story to Mexico in the early 20th century, at the brink of the Mexican Revolution and its land reform. It stars Sara García, Lupita Tovar, Emilio Tuero and Rafael Banquells.

External links
 

1943 films
1940s Spanish-language films
Mexican black-and-white films
Mexican drama films
1943 drama films
1940s Mexican films